The Vomano is a 76 km river, which is in the Abruzzo region of Italy. Its source is near Monte San Franco in Gran Sasso d'Italia and Lago di Campotosto in the province of L'Aquila. The river crosses the border into the province of Teramo and flows northeast near Montorio al Vomano and Basciano. The Fucino flows into the Vomano south of Crognaleto and the Mavone flows into the Vomano near Basciano. It enters the Adriatic Sea near Roseto degli Abruzzi.

References

Rivers of the Province of L'Aquila
Rivers of the Province of Teramo
Rivers of Italy
Adriatic Italian coast basins